Hollywood Varieties is a 1949 American film from Lippert Productions starring Robert Alda and directed by Paul Landres. The Los Angeles Times called it a "vaudeville show on screen with Robert Alda as master of ceremonies."

Cast
Robert Alda
Hoosier Hot Shots
Shaw & Lee
3 Rio Brothers
Glen Vernon and Eddie Ryan
Britt Wood
Peggy Stewart
Twirl, Whirl & a Girl
De Pina Troupe
The Four Dandies
Lois Ray

Production
The film was one of a series of revue-style musicals financed by Robert Lippert. The first was Square Dance Jubilee and this one was about vaudeville. According to Jone Ormond:
I wrote this little beginning about vaudeville dying, and Bob Lippert loved it. The picture cost $10,000. 1 got all the acts I knew from my years on the road Brit Wood... We shot with three cameras in a downtown L.A. theater. I worked day and night on the picture, even slept on the set. Only problem was I hadn't come up with the ending yet. I had 20 minutes - the crew was gonna quit at five and we couldn't afford to keep 'em around. I made one of my choreography maps with the dots, an' I said, 'Gimme a few minutes, I'll put mic on.' There was almost 100 people on the set, but I got 'em all where they had to go."

References

External links

Hollywood Varieties at TCMDB

1949 films
American musical films
Films directed by Paul Landres
Films scored by Albert Glasser
1950s musical films
Lippert Pictures films
American black-and-white films
1950s English-language films
1940s English-language films
1940s American films
1950s American films